Kazimierz Tadeusz Naskręcki (born 4 March 1938, in Kalisz) is a retired Polish Olympic rower.

References

1938 births
Living people
Polish male rowers
Rowers at the 1964 Summer Olympics
Olympic rowers of Poland
Sportspeople from Kalisz
European Rowing Championships medalists
20th-century Polish people